The Chronicles of Jerahmeel is a voluminous work that draws largely on Pseudo-Philo's earlier history of Biblical events and is of special interest because it includes Hebrew and Aramaic versions of certain deuterocanonical books in the Septuagint.

The Chronicles were published in English as The Chronicles of Jerahmeel Or, the Hebrew Bible Historiale by the Royal Asiatic Society, translated by Moses Gaster, 1899. Gaster stated in his extensive preface his view (p. xx) that the Chronicles were compiled from several Hebrew sources, some quite ancient and others more recent.

The actual compiler of the chronicles identifies himself as "Eleasar ben Asher the Levite" who, according to Gaster, lived in the Rhineland in the 14th century.  The most recent events depicted in the Chronicles refer to the time of the Crusades, but the entire rest of it pertains to the period before AD 70. Among the early sources quoted in the work is the 1st century Rabbi Eliezer ben Hyrcanus.

Gaster explained that he chose to title it "Chronicles of Jerahmeel" instead of "Chronicles of Eleasar" because of his analysis that Eleasar was merely a compiler, while the enigmatic "Jeraḥmeel" is the source most extensively reproduced, following the Yosippon which is otherwise extant. This 'Jerahmeel' has since been identified as Jerahmeel ben Solomon, thought to have flourished in Italy around 1150. After a thorough discussion of all the textual evidence, Gaster further concluded that, like the closely related Sefer haYashar, it relies on sources ultimately dependent on Isidore of Seville, particularly evident in its mention of "Franks" and "Lombards" among the Sons of Noah.

See also
 The Asatir
 Jerahmeel
 Samaritan Chronicle
 Tolidah

References

External links
The Chronicles of Jerahmeel at sacred-texts
The Chronicles of Jerahmeel at archive.org

Hebrew manuscripts
Hebrew-language chronicles
Old Testament pseudepigrapha
Samaritan culture and history